The 2016–17 Big Ten men's basketball season began with practices in October 2016, followed by the start of the 2016–17 NCAA Division I men's basketball season in November. The Conference held its preseason media day on October 13 in Washington, D.C. The season began on November 11 and conference play started on December 27.

With a win over Indiana on February 28, 2017, Purdue clinched at least a share of the Big Ten regular season championship. With Wisconsin's loss on March 2, Purdue clinched an outright championship, their 23rd championship, the most in Big Ten history.

The Big Ten tournament was held from March 8 through March 12 at the Verizon Center in Washington, D.C. It was the first Big Ten Conference tournament not held in Indianapolis or Chicago. Michigan won the Big Ten tournament over Wisconsin, becoming the first eight seed and lowest seeded team to win the conference tournament and marking their first win since their vacated win in the inaugural tournament. As a result, Michigan received the conference's automatic bid to the NCAA tournament.

Purdue forward Caleb Swanigan was named Big Ten Player of the Year and a second team Academic All-America. Minnesota coach Richard Pitino was named Big Ten Coach of the Year. Swanigan earned consensus first team All-American recognition and Wisconsin forward Ethan Happ was a third team All-American by multiple media outlets.

Seven Big Ten schools (Maryland, Michigan, Michigan State, Minnesota, Northwestern, Purdue, and Wisconsin) were invited to the NCAA tournament, marking the seventh consecutive year the Big Ten had at least six teams in the Tournament. Northwestern received a bid for the first time in school history. Illinois, Indiana, and Iowa represented the conference in the  National Invitation Tournament. The conference achieved an 8–7 record in the NCAA tournament and a 3–3 record in the NIT, highlighted by Michigan, Purdue, and Wisconsin reaching the NCAA Sweet Sixteen and Illinois making the NIT quarterfinals.

Head coaches

Coaching changes

Wisconsin 
On December 15, 2015, Wisconsin coach Bo Ryan announced he would retire effective immediately leaving associate head coach Greg Gard as interim head coach. Shortly after the regular season, Greg Gard had the interim tag removed as he was announced as the permanent head coach.

Rutgers 
On March 20, 2016, the school fired head coach Eddie Jordan after three years at Rutgers. On March 19, the school hired Steve Pikiell, former head coach at Stony Brook, as head coach.

Coaches

Notes:
 Year at school includes 2016–17 season.
 Overall and Big Ten records are from time at current school and are through the end the 2016–17 season.
 Turgeon's ACC conference record excluded since Maryland began Big Ten Conference play in 2014–15.
 Following the conclusion of the Big Ten tournament, Illinois fired head coach John Groce. Assistant coach Jamall Walker will coach the team in the NIT.

Preseason

Preseason All-Big Ten
On October 11, 2016, a panel of conference media selected a 10-member preseason All-Big Ten Team and Player of the Year.

Preseason watchlists
Below is a table of notable preseason watch lists.

Preseason All-American teams

Preseason polls

Regular season

Rankings

Player of the week
Throughout the conference regular season, the Big Ten offices named one or two players of the week and one or two freshmen of the week each Monday.

Conference matrix
This table summarizes the head-to-head results between teams in conference play. Each team played 18 conference games, and at least 1 against each opponent.

Honors and awards
Caleb Swanigan was a unanimous first team All-American selection by Associated Press, USBWA, NABC and Sporting News. Ethan Happ was a third team selection by all but the NABC.

All-Big Ten awards and teams
On March 6, the Big Ten announced most of its conference awards.

AP All-Big Ten awards and teams

USBWA
On March 7, the U.S. Basketball Writers Association released its 2016–17 Men's All-District Teams, based upon voting from its national membership. There were nine regions from coast to coast, and a player and coach of the year were selected in each. The following lists all the Big Ten representatives selected within their respective regions.

District II (NY, NJ, DE, DC, PA, WV)
none

District III (VA, NC, SC, MD)
Melo Trimble, Maryland

District V (OH, IN, IL, MI, MN, WI)
Player of the Year
Caleb Swanigan, Purdue
Coach of the Year
Matt Painter, Purdue
All-District Team
Miles Bridges, Michigan State
Ethan Happ, Wisconsin
Malcolm Hill, Illinois
Nate Mason, Minnesota
Bryant McIntosh, Northwestern
Caleb Swanigan, Purdue
Derrick Walton Jr., Michigan

District VI (IA, MO, KS, OK, NE, ND, SD)
Peter Jok, Iowa
Tai Webster, Nebraska

NABC
The National Association of Basketball Coaches announced their Division I All-District teams on March 22, recognizing the nation's best men's collegiate basketball student-athletes. Selected and voted on by member coaches of the NABC, the selections on this list were then eligible for NABC Coaches' All-America Honors. The following list represented the District 7 players chosen to the list.

First Team
Melo Trimble, Maryland
Caleb Swanigan, Purdue
Ethan Happ, Wisconsin
Peter Jok, Iowa
Miles Bridges, Michigan State

Second Team
Nate Mason, Minnesota
Derrick Walton, Jr., Michigan
Bryant McIntosh, Northwestern
Tai Webster, Nebraska
Nigel Hayes, Wisconsin

Other awards
Nicolas Baer, Zak Irvin, Sanjay Lumpkin, Keita Bates-Diop, Payton Banks, Isaac Haas and Vitto Brown were nominees for the Allstate Good Works Team in honor of their volunteerism and civic involvement. On January 6, 2017, Malcolm Hill, Peter Jok, Derrick Walton, Nigel Hayes and Bronson Koenig were included on the 30-man Senior CLASS Award candidate list. Melo Trimble was the only returning selection among the January 11 Wooden Award top 25. He was joined by Ethan Happ, Nigel Hayes and Caleb Swanigan. Happ and Swanigan were on the Robertson midseason 19-man watchlist. Trimble was named to the Cousy Award Final 10 on January 30. Swanigan and Miles Bridges were named Malone Award top 10 finalists on February 2. Happ was named as a Jabbar Award top 10 finalist the following day. Swanigan, Trimble and Happ were named to both the February 9 Wooden Top 20 and the February 9 Naismith Top 30 lists. Swanigan and Moritz Wagner were named to the February 9, 2016–17 NCAA Division I Academic All-District Men's Basketball Team for District 5 (IL, IN, MI, OH), placing them among the 40 finalists for the Academic All-American 15-man team. Hayes and Jok were named to the 10-man Senior CLASS Award finalist list.   Swanigan was named a second team Academic All-America selection on March 2.

Postseason

Big Ten tournament

* denotes overtime period

NCAA tournament

The winner of the Big Ten tournament, Michigan, received the conference's automatic bid to the 2017 NCAA Division I men's basketball tournament. Six other conference school received at-large bids to the Tournament: Purdue, Minnesota, Maryland, Northwestern, Wisconsin, and Michigan State.

National Invitation tournament
Three Big Ten teams received invitations to the National Invitation Tournament: Iowa, Illinois, and Indiana.

2017 NBA draft

The following all-conference selections were listed as seniors or graduate students: Peter Jok, Malcolm Hill, Derrick Walton, Bronson Koenig, Tai Webster, and Nigel Hayes.  The following players were invited to the NBA Draft Combine: OG Anunoby, Thomas Bryant, Justin Jackson, Caleb Swanigan, Melo Trimble, Moritz Wagner, and D. J. Wilson, while Derrick Walton was named as an alternate. Eventually, Walton, Jok and Hayes accepted invitations as alternates. Wilson (17th),  Anunoby (23rd), Swanigan (26th) and Bryant (42nd) were selected in the draft.

References